Ainsworth was an unincorporated community in Ross Township, Lake County, Indiana.

The Grand Trunk Railroad was extended to Ainsworth in 1880.

In the early 1990s the area containing Ainsworth was annexed by the city of Hobart. A failed attempt to fight the annexation would have seen the area incorporated into the town of Ainsworth, thus bringing back the name of the old village. It is located near the intersection of Indiana State Road 51 and the Canadian National Railway (formerly the Grand Trunk Western Railroad).

Geography

References

Unincorporated communities in Lake County, Indiana
Unincorporated communities in Indiana